This list of notable fiddlers shows some overlap with the list of violinists since the instrument used by fiddlers is the violin.

Alphabetical by last name

By style

North American

Canadian styles

Mexican styles

US styles

European fiddling styles

Irish styles

Jewish styles

Norwegian styles

UK styles

Sri Lankan fiddle style 
Dinesh Subasinghe

Trans-regional styles

Folk

Jazz

Rock

Fiddlers